Matsumoto (松本 or 松元, "base of the pine tree") may refer to:

Places 
 Matsumoto, Nagano (松本市), a city
 Matsumoto Airport, an airport southwest of Matsumoto, Nagano
 Matsumoto, Kagoshima (松元町), a former town now part of the city of Kagoshima 
 Matsumoto Domain, a feudal domain in Shinano Province, modern-day Nagano Prefecture
 Matsumoto Pond, a pond in Victoria Land, Antarctica

Other uses 
 Matsumoto (surname), a surname and list of people with the name
 Matsumoto Castle, a castle in Matsumoto, Nagano
 Matsumoto Baseball Stadium, a baseball stadium in Matsumoto, Nagano
 Matsumoto Bus Terminal, a bus terminal in Matsumoto, Nagano
 Matsumoto Station, a railway station in Matsumoto, Nagano
 Matsumoto University, a university in Matsumoto, Nagano
 The Peninsula Hong Kong or Matsumoto Hotel

See also
 Matsumoto sarin attack, Sarin gas release in Matsumoto, Nagano
 Matsumoto zeta function, a type of zeta function introduced by Kohji Matsumoto in 1990